Tyson Hesse (born August 30, 1984) is an American graphic novel illustrator and director, known for his work on the Sonic the Hedgehog franchise.

Career

Webcomics 
Hesse produced the webcomic Boxer Hockey, which he started in 2006. Hesse also created the graphic novel Diesel and its follow-up, Tyson Hesse’s Diesel: Ignition. The graphic novel follows Diana "Dee" Diesel, a teenager about to become captain of an airship colony, who gets caught in a war.

Sonic the Hedgehog 
Hesse worked as an artist for the Sonic the Hedgehog comic series from Archie Comics. He later served as the animation director on trailers and animated cutscenes for the 2017 platform game Sonic Mania and its promotional mini-series, Sonic Mania Adventures. Hesse also directed the Team Sonic Racing Overdrive shorts which promoted 2019's Team Sonic Racing, the animated cutscenes for 2022's Sonic Origins, and the promotional animated short for 2022's Sonic Frontiers, Sonic Frontiers Prologue: Divergence. Hesse has also contributed to IDW Publishing's Sonic the Hedgehog comic series.

After the trailer for the 2020 Sonic the Hedgehog film was released in 2019 and Sonic's design was strongly criticised, Hesse was brought in as the lead artist to redesign Sonic. Hesse returned for the sequel as the character design lead, storyboard supervisor, and co-producer.

Other work 
Hesse has contributed art to the video game Dream Daddy and the comic book series The Amazing World of Gumball, based on the television series of the same name. He was also a storyboard artist for the movie Invader Zim: Enter the Florpus.

Comics

References

External links
 Sonic Mania Plus: The Story of Tyson Hesse

Living people
Place of birth missing (living people)
1984 births
American animators
American comics creators
American webcomic creators
Sonic the Hedgehog